Louisiana's 26th State Senate district is one of 39 districts in the Louisiana State Senate. It has been represented by Republican Bob Hensgens since a 2018 special election to succeed fellow Republican Jonathan Perry.

Geography
District 26 covers all of Vermilion Parish and parts of Acadia, Lafayette, and St. Landry Parishes in Acadiana, including some or all of Abbeville, Kaplan, Erath, Scott, Rayne, Church Point, and Sunset.

The district overlaps with Louisiana's 3rd and 4th congressional districts, and with the 31st, 39th, 40th, 41st, 42nd, 45th, 47th, and 49th districts of the Louisiana House of Representatives.

Recent election results
Louisiana uses a jungle primary system. If no candidate receives 50% in the first round of voting, when all candidates appear on the same ballot regardless of party, the top-two finishers advance to a runoff election.

2019

2018 special

2015

2011

Federal and statewide results in District 26

References

Louisiana State Senate districts
Acadia Parish, Louisiana
Lafayette Parish, Louisiana
St. Landry Parish, Louisiana
Vermilion Parish, Louisiana